Masala chai (also known simply as chai, is an Indian beverage popular throughout South Asia. Chai is made by brewing black tea (usually CTC tea) in milk and water and then sweetening with sugar. While some variants may also include the addition of aromatic herbs and spices, known colloquially as Masala chai, the most common preparation is unspiced.

The term chai originated from the Hindi word, chai (चाय), which was derived from the Chinese word for tea,  . In English, this spiced tea is commonly referred to as masala chai, or simply chai, even though the term refers to tea in general in the original language. 

Originating in India the beverage has gained worldwide popularity, becoming a feature in many coffee and tea houses, with many using the term chai latte or chai tea latte for their version to indicate that it is made with steamed milk, much like that used to make a caffè latte but mixed with a spiced tea concentrate instead of espresso. By 1994, the term had gained currency on the U.S. coffeehouse scene.

History

Tea plants have grown wild in the Assam region since antiquity, but historically, Indians viewed tea as a herbal medicine rather than as a recreational beverage.

In the 1830s, the British East India Company became concerned about the Chinese monopoly on tea, which constituted most of its trade and supported the enormous consumption of tea in Great Britain around one pound (by weight) per person per year. British colonists had recently noticed the existence of the Assamese tea plants, and began to cultivate tea plantations locally. In 1870, over 90% of the tea consumed in Great Britain was still of Chinese origin, but by 1900, this had dropped to 10%, largely replaced by tea grown in India (50%) and Ceylon (33%), present-day Sri Lanka.

However, consumption of black tea within India remained low until the promotional campaign by the Indian Tea Association in the early 20th century, which encouraged factories, mines, and textile mills to provide tea breaks for their workers. It also supported many independent chaiwalas throughout the growing railway system.

The official promotion of tea was as served in the Indian mode, with small added amounts of milk and sugar. The Indian Tea Association initially disapproved of independent vendors' tendency to add spices and greatly increase the proportions of milk and sugar, thus reducing their usage (and thus purchase) of tea leaves per liquid volume. However, chai in its present form has now firmly established itself as a popular beverage.

Ingredients

Tea
Black tea is typically used as base in most chai recipes. The most common type of black tea is Assam; however, a blend of different tea variations may be used. Assam, Darjeeling, and Nilgiri are the three most common types of tea used in chai in India.

Spices

The traditional masala chai is a spiced beverage brewed with different proportions of warming spices. The spice mixture, called karha, uses a base of ground ginger and green cardamom pods. Other spices are usually added to this karha including one or more of cinnamon, star anise, fennel seeds, peppercorn, nutmeg, cloves, cardamom seeds, ginger root, honey, vanilla, and other spices.

Masala chai in western India often excludes clove and black peppercorn. A small amount of salt is often added to chai in the region of Bhopal. The Kashmiri version of chai is brewed with green tea instead of black tea and has a more subtle blend of spices with a pinch of salt. This version is a bit savory and is pink in color, due to the addition of baking soda.

Milk

Traditionally in India, water buffalo milk is used to make chai. Although whole milk is usually used in masala chai, alternative dairy milk such as soy milk or skim milk is also a preferred option across the world.

Sweetener

White sugar, brown sugar, Demerara sugar, or honey may be used as sweetener in chai. Jaggery may also be used as a sweetener.

Preparation

The simplest traditional method of preparing masala chai is through decoction, by actively simmering or boiling a mixture of milk and water with loose-leaf tea, sweeteners, and whole spices. Indian markets all over the world sell various brands of chai masala, for this purpose, though many households or tea vendors, known in India as chai wallahs, blend their own. The solid tea and spice residues are strained off from masala chai before serving.

The method may vary according to taste or local custom; for example, some households may combine all of the ingredients at the start, bring the mixture to a boil, then immediately strain and serve; others may leave the mixture simmering for a longer time, or begin by bringing the tea leaves to a boil and only add the spices toward the end (or vice versa).

A common Maharashtrian practice for preparation of one cup of chai is to first combine one half cup of water with one-half cup of milk in a pot over heat. Sugar may be added at this point or after. Ginger is then grated into the mixture followed by adding a "tea masala". Although the ingredients may vary from region to region, "tea masala" typically consists of crushed ginger, crushed cardamom, lemongrass, cloves, and cinnamon. The mixture is brought to a boil and 1 teaspoon of loose black tea is added. The chai is immediately taken off the heat, covered, and allowed to sit for about 10 minutes to allow the black tea to infuse into the chai. The chai is then strained and served.

Consumption of tea in the Indian subcontinent

Masala chai is a very popular beverage in the Indian subcontinent (India, Pakistan, Nepal and Sri Lanka). In Northeastern India and Bangladesh, however, masala chai is not the usual form; instead, tea with just milk and sugar is common and is called "cha". 

Small vendors (called chaiwalla in Hindi/cha-ola in Bengali) are found by the side of every highway, road and alley – often the only establishments that will be open through the night. They generally also sell tobacco and snacks.
 
In the metropolitan city of Mumbai, roadside tea stalls serve smaller cups of tea at a lower budget which is referred to as 'cutting chai', the term 'cutting' referring to the halving of quantity contained in a full cup to reduce the cost of the cup of tea. Circa 2020, the cost of a 'cutting' cup of tea varies between ₹6 and ₹10 – a full cup costing ₹10 to ₹20.

Consumption beyond the Indian subcontinent

Masala chai is popular in East Africa and the Caribbean. It is also quite popular in the GCC; but it is locally known as Karak Tea or Chai Karak.

In Western cultures
Many Western supermarkets offer teabags of chai which contain an assortment of ground chai spices and require steeping in hot water.

In the West, to better simulate water buffalo milk, one may try using dry or powdered milk, along with the raw or turbinado sugar normally used in India. In addition, as milk consumption in all age groups in the West has started to decrease steadily over the last 50 years, substitutes such as oat and almond milk have emerged as an alternative to water buffalo milk as well. One East-West fusion chai adds a small pinch of dark cocoa powder, indigenous to the Central Americas, to create hot chai-co-latte.

Cold chai
As an alternative to the hot tea format, several types of cold "chai" beverages have become popular in the United States. These range in complexity from a simple spiced iced tea without milk to a slush of spiced tea, ice, and milk (or nondairy creamer) mixed in a blender and topped with whipped cream.

Components

Depending on the establishment, chai with added espresso is now called a "java chai", "red eye chai", "turbocharger", "chai charger", "tough guy chai", and the American's preferred "dirty chai", among others.

See also

 Indian cuisine
 History of tea in India
 Indian tea culture
 Chaiwala
 Kulhar
 Darjeeling tea
 Noon chai
 Bandrek
 List of Indian beverages

References

External links

 The Global Evolution of Chai 

Indian tea
Indian cuisine
Arabic drinks
Bengali cuisine
Blended tea
Indo-Caribbean cuisine
Nepalese tea
Pakistani tea
Sri Lankan drinks
Tea culture
Milk tea